In geometry, the rectified 600-cell or rectified hexacosichoron is a convex uniform 4-polytope composed of 600 regular octahedra and 120 icosahedra cells. Each edge has two octahedra and one icosahedron. Each vertex has five octahedra and two icosahedra. In total it has 3600 triangle faces, 3600 edges, and 720 vertices.

Containing the cell realms of both the regular 120-cell and the regular 600-cell, it can be considered analogous to the polyhedron icosidodecahedron, which is a rectified icosahedron and rectified dodecahedron.

The vertex figure of the rectified 600-cell is a uniform pentagonal prism.

Semiregular polytope 
It is one of three semiregular 4-polytopes made of two or more cells which are Platonic solids, discovered by Thorold Gosset in his 1900 paper. He called it a octicosahedric for being made of octahedron and icosahedron cells.

E. L. Elte identified it in 1912 as a semiregular polytope, labeling it as tC600.

Alternate names 
 octicosahedric (Thorold Gosset)
 Icosahedral hexacosihecatonicosachoron
 Rectified 600-cell (Norman W. Johnson)
 Rectified hexacosichoron
 Rectified polytetrahedron
 Rox (Jonathan Bowers)

Images

Related polytopes

Diminished rectified 600-cell 

A related vertex-transitive polytope can be constructed with equal edge lengths removes 120 vertices from the rectified 600-cell, but isn't uniform because it contains square pyramid cells, discovered by George Olshevsky, calling it a swirlprismatodiminished rectified hexacosichoron, with 840 cells (600 square pyramids, 120 pentagonal prisms, and 120 pentagonal antiprisms), 2640 faces (1800 triangles, 600 square, and 240 pentagons), 2400 edges, and 600 vertices. It has a chiral bi-diminished pentagonal prism vertex figure.

Each removed vertex creates a pentagonal prism cell, and diminishes two neighboring icosahedra into pentagonal antiprisms, and each octahedron into a square pyramid.

This polytope can be partitioned into 12 rings of alternating 10 pentagonal prisms and 10 antiprisms, and 30 rings of square pyramids.

Net

H4 family

Pentagonal prism vertex figures

References 

 Kaleidoscopes: Selected Writings of H. S. M. Coxeter, edited by F. Arthur Sherk, Peter McMullen, Anthony C. Thompson, Asia Ivic Weiss, Wiley-Interscience Publication, 1995,  
 (Paper 22) H.S.M. Coxeter, Regular and Semi-Regular Polytopes I, [Math. Zeit. 46 (1940) 380-407, MR 2,10]
 (Paper 23) H.S.M. Coxeter, Regular and Semi-Regular Polytopes II, [Math. Zeit. 188 (1985) 559-591]
 (Paper 24) H.S.M. Coxeter, Regular and Semi-Regular Polytopes III, [Math. Zeit. 200 (1988) 3-45]
 J.H. Conway and M.J.T. Guy: Four-Dimensional Archimedean Polytopes, Proceedings of the Colloquium on Convexity at Copenhagen, page 38 und 39, 1965
 N.W. Johnson: The Theory of Uniform Polytopes and Honeycombs, Ph.D. Dissertation, University of Toronto, 1966
Four-dimensional Archimedean Polytopes (German), Marco Möller, 2004 PhD dissertation

External links 
 
 
 Archimedisches Polychor Nr. 45 (rectified 600-cell) Marco Möller's Archimedean polytopes in R4 (German)
 H4 uniform polytopes with coordinates: r{3,3,5}

4-polytopes